Nothing Is Not Breath: Music for Double Quartet is a live album by Jeff Kaiser, released in 1998 on Nine Winds, NWCD0206. AllMusic said that "Many fans of avant-garde jazz find his 1997 recording Nothing Is Not Breath: Music for Double Quartet to be one of the best presentations of Southern California improvising talent ever recorded, indicating his superior talents as a bandleader and conductor."

Track listing

Personnel 
 Bass clarinet, flute [alto], bass saxophone, soprano saxophone – Vinny Golia
 Double bass – Hannes Giger, Jim Connolly
 Drums, toys, whistle [human] – Richard West
 Organ [pump], trumpet – Jeff Kaiser
 Trombone – Michael Vlatkovitch
 Trombone, chimes, gong, marimba, timpani, bodhrán, rattles – Brad Dutz
 Engineer – Roy Jones
 Mastered by John Golden
 Cover art, design – Ted Killian

References 

1998 albums
Avant-garde jazz albums